Marcelo Miguel Pelissari (born 20 August 1975) is a Brazilian former footballer who played as a defender. In club football, he played in Série A for Portuguesa, in the Portuguese Segunda Liga for União da Madeira, in the J1 League for Shimizu S-Pulse, as well as at lower levels of the Brazilian league system.

Internationally, he played for the Brazil under-20 team that won the 1995 South American U-20 Championship, where he was named in the Ideal Team of the Tournament. He captained the team that finished as runners-up at the 1995 FIFA World Youth Championship, and played in their first five matches but was suspended for the final.

Honours
Brazil U20
 South American U-20 Championship winners: 1995
 FIFA World Youth Championship runners-up: 1995

References

1975 births
Living people
People from Jandaia do Sul
Brazilian footballers
Brazil under-20 international footballers
Association football defenders
Guarani FC players
Shimizu S-Pulse players
Associação Portuguesa de Desportos players
Goiás Esporte Clube players
J. Malucelli Futebol players
Avaí FC players
C.F. União players
Mogi Mirim Esporte Clube players
União Agrícola Barbarense Futebol Clube players
Sociedade Esportiva e Recreativa Caxias do Sul players
J1 League players
Campeonato Brasileiro Série A players
Campeonato Brasileiro Série B players
Liga Portugal 2 players
Expatriate footballers in Japan
Expatriate footballers in Portugal
Brazilian expatriate footballers
Sportspeople from Paraná (state)